Daisy Liu Waite (born 9 September 2005) is an English-Chinese actress, model and presenter. She is best known for portraying Mei-Xue, in the Chinese 2014 adventure film Balala the Fairies: The Magic Trial. On TV she is known for presenting a regular feature on the Hunan Broadcasting System show Playing Tricks (玩名堂), broadcast nationally on the Aniworld Satellite TV channel. Daisy has also modeled for large brands such as ANTA Sports. Daisy was born in Reading, Berkshire, England but has resided in Changsha, Hunan since she was 3 years old.

Filmography

Film

Television

References

External links
 

2005 births
Living people
21st-century Chinese actresses
Chinese female models
Chinese child actresses
Chinese film actresses
Chinese television actresses
actors from Reading, Berkshire
English people of Chinese descent
English emigrants to China
Chinese people of English descent